Northern Stage is a regional non-profit LORT (League of Resident Theatres)-D professional theater company located in White River Junction, VT.

Founded in 1997 by Brooke Ciardelli. 

Northern Stage launched New Works Now in 2014.

Northern Stage is part of the BOLD Theater Women’s Leadership Circle, with Carol Dunne being the founder of the cohort.

References 

Theatre companies in Vermont
Theatres in Vermont
White River Junction, Vermont
Tourist attractions in Windsor County, Vermont